Mahmoud Kadri (born 8 October 1917) was an Egyptian swimmer. He competed in two events at the 1936 Summer Olympics.

References

External links

1917 births
Possibly living people
Egyptian male swimmers
Olympic swimmers of Egypt
Swimmers at the 1936 Summer Olympics
Place of birth missing